The  San Diego Chargers season was the franchise's third season in the National Football League (NFL), and its 13th overall. The team failed to improve on their 6–8 record in 1971. The Chargers would get off to a poor start, as they were devoured 34-3 in their season opener at San Francisco. After their week 2 win against the Denver Broncos, the Chargers would play to a 17-17 draw with another cross-state rival, the Oakland Raiders. It was San Diego's fourth tie in 3 seasons (they tied 3 times in 1970). Even after they defeated the Baltimore Colts in the week following the tie, the Bolts would stumble the rest of the year, winning only 2 more games en route to a 4-9-1 season. This squad featured several players like Duane Thomas, Tim Rossovich, Dave Costa and John Mackey who were unwanted by most of the other NFL teams.

NFL Draft

Roster

Regular season

Schedule

Standings

Notable events 
In their last game for the year, the Chargers became the thirty-third team in the NFL or leagues that merged with the NFL to score only a safety in a full game. This unusual occurrence has been repeated only five times since: by the 1980 Buffalo Bills, the 1983 Minnesota Vikings, the 1993 Cincinnati Bengals, the 2011 Atlanta Falcons (the only team to do so in a playoff game) and the 2013 Jacksonville Jaguars.

References 

San Diego Chargers
San Diego Chargers seasons
San Diego Chargers f